This is a list of prisons within Anhui province of the People's Republic of China.

References

 
Anhui